Măgura is a commune in Bacău County, Western Moldavia, Romania. It is composed of four villages: Crihan, Dealu Mare, Măgura and Sohodol.

References

Communes in Bacău County
Localities in Western Moldavia